Vetiver is an American folk band headed by songwriter Andy Cabic.

History
Vetiver was formed in San Francisco in 2002.  The band released their self-titled debut album in 2004 on the small indie folk label DiCristina. Since the album's release, Vetiver has toured extensively, opening for and collaborating with Devendra Banhart and Joanna Newsom. Vetiver released another album, To Find Me Gone, on DiCristina in 2006. Banhart and Cabic also launched their own label, Gnomonsong Recordings, releasing Jana Hunter's Blank Unstaring Heirs of Doom in 2005 and There's No Home in 2007. The label also released in 2008 Vetiver's Thing of the Past, a collection of cover songs that have influenced Cabic's aesthetic. Sub Pop Records (US) and Bella Union (UK) released Vetiver's Tight Knit (2009) The Errant Charm (2011), and Complete Strangers (2015).

The band shared the bill with Vashti Bunyan on her US tour in early 2007. Over the years, the band has toured with artists like Fleet Foxes, The Shins, Fruit Bats and Wilco.

Cabic's music has also been featured in numerous TV commercials, including an original song for Birds Eye. He also works as a composer, including the documentary The Family Jams and the film Smashed, which was shown at the Sundance Film Festival in 2012.

Discography

Albums
 Vetiver (DiCristina, 2004)
 To Find Me Gone (DiCristina, FatCat, 2006)
 Thing of the Past (Gnomonsong / FatCat, 2008)
 Tight Knit (Sub Pop / Bella Union, 2009)
 The Errant Charm (Sub Pop / Bella Union, 2011)
 Complete Strangers (Easy Sound, 2015)
 Up on High (Mama Bird / Loose Music, 2019)

EPs
 Between (DiCristina, 2005)
 "You May Be Blue" (Gnomonsong, 2008)
 "More of the Past" (Gnomonsong, 2008)

Other contributions
Acoustic 07 (V2 Records, 2007) - "Been So Long"
The Believer 2004 Music Issue - "Be Kind to Me"
The Golden Apples Of The Sun (Bastet, 2004) – "Angel's Share"
Johnny Boy Would Love This...A Tribute to John Martyn (Hole in the Rain Music, 2011) – "Go Easy"

References

External links

There’s no place like home MSNBC Interview, May 25, 2006.
Indie Music Pick: Vetiver Audio review on Weekend America, July 29, 2006. (RealPlayer)
Andy Cabic video interview Hi-nu.com, Sep 5 2006 (French subtitles). (Flash)
Video Interview with Andy Cabic via Naturalismo
A Grab Bag of Goodies Andy Cabic lists 19 of his favorite tunes. Discollective, July 1, 2007.
Interview with Andy Cabic. PlugInMusic.com
Top 10 of 2007 Andy Cabic shares his top 10 albums of 2007. PlugInMusic.com

American folk musical groups
Psychedelic folk groups
Freak folk
Musical groups from San Francisco
Sub Pop artists
Bella Union artists
Loose Music artists
Spacebomb Records artists
FatCat Records artists